Richard "Moose" Southerton Stovall (June 4, 1922 – June 4, 1999) was an American football center in the National Football League for the Detroit Lions and the Washington Redskins.  He played college football at Abilene Christian University which was Abilene Christian College at that time.

1922 births
1999 deaths
People from Albany, Texas
American football centers
Abilene Christian Wildcats football players
Detroit Lions players
Washington Redskins players